Timoninskaya is a rural locality (a village) in Mishutinskoye Rural Settlement, Vozhegodsky District, Vologda Oblast, Russia. The population was 2 as of 2002.

Geography 
The distance to Vozhega is 73 km, to Mishutinskaya is 7 km. Yesinskaya, Alferyevskaya, Loshchinskaya, Glazunovskaya are the nearest rural localities.

References 

Rural localities in Vozhegodsky District